Víctor López Ibáñez (born 12 May 1997) is a Spanish professional footballer who plays for Algeciras CF as either a right back or a right winger.

Club career
Born in Logroño, La Rioja, López joined Deportivo Alavés in 2015, from UD Logroñés, and was initially assigned to the reserves in Tercera División. He scored his first senior goal on 15 November of that year, netting the winner in a 1–0 away success over CD Lagun Onak.

On 8 February 2016, López scored a brace in an 8–1 home routing of CD Basconia. He made his first team debut on 3 January 2018, starting in a 3–1 away win against SD Formentera, for the season's Copa del Rey.

López made his La Liga debut on 6 May 2018, starting in a 3–0 away defeat of Málaga CF. On 7 August, he extended his contract until 2021 and was loaned to Segunda División B side UD Logroñés for one year.

Upon returning, López featured exclusively for the B-team before moving to Primera División RFEF side Algeciras CF on 30 June 2021.

Personal life
López's uncle Titín III is a Basque pelota player.

References

External links
Deportivo Alavés profile 

1997 births
Living people
Sportspeople from Logroño
Spanish footballers
Footballers from La Rioja (Spain)
Association football defenders
Association football wingers
La Liga players
Segunda División B players
Tercera División players
Deportivo Alavés B players
Deportivo Alavés players
UD Logroñés players
Algeciras CF footballers